BDF-521 is a remote galaxy with a redshift of z = 7.008 corresponds to a distance traveled by light to come down to Earth of 12.89 billion light years.

See also
List of the most distant astronomical objects
List of galaxies

Galaxies
Piscis Austrinus